The 738th Expeditionary Airlift Squadron is a provisional United States Air Force unit.  It is assigned to Air Combat Command (ACC) to activate or inactivate as needed.  It operates Lockheed C-130 Hercules aircraft in theater airlift missions as part of the Global War on Terrorism.  Its current status and duty location is undetermined.

The squadron was first activated as the 738th Bombardment Squadron in June 1943.  After training in the United States with the Consolidated B-24 Liberator, the squadron deployed to the Mediterranean Theater of Operations, participating in the strategic bombing campaign against Germany.   It earned two Distinguished Unit Citations for its combat operations.  Following V-E Day, the squadron returned to the United States for conversion as a very heavy bomber unit, but was inactivated instead.

The squadron was activated in the reserves in 1947, but does not appear to have been fully staffed or equipped before inactivating in 1949.  It was redesignated the 738th Troop Carrier Squadron and again activated in the reserve in 1952, but was inactivated the following year and its personnel and equipment transferred to another unit.  It was converted to provisional status in 2002 and assigned to Air Mobility Command.  It was reassigned to ACC in 2003.

History

World War II
The squadron was first organized as the 738th Bombardment Squadron at Alamogordo Army Air Field, New Mexico on 1 June 1943 as one of the four squadrons of the 454th Bombardment Group.  It trained with Consolidated B-24 Liberator bombers.  After completing training, it left for the Mediterranean Theater of Operations on 8 December 1943.

The squadron arrived in Italy, settling in at its combat station, San Giovanni Airfield, by the end of January 1944. Its primary focus was on long range bombing missions against industrial targets such as enemy oil refineries and munitions and aircraft factories.  It struck transportation targets including harbors and airfields in Italy, France, Germany, Austria, Czechoslovakia, Hungary, Yugoslavia, Greece and Romania  The squadron received a Distinguished Unit Citation (DUC) for a raid on an airfield at Bad Vöslau, Austria on 12 April 1944. The squadron earned a second DUC during an attack on a steel plant at Linz, Austria, as the 454th Group led its wing through determined opposition.

The squadron also flew air support and air interdiction missions against marshalling yards, troop concentrations and rail lines for Operation Strangle, the effort to choke off enemy supply lines in Italy.  The squadron participated in the drive to Rome; Operation Dragoon, the invasion of southern France; and Operation Grapeshot, the Spring 1945 offensive in Northern Italy.

The squadron left Italy in July 1945 and reformed at Sioux Falls Army Air Field, South Dakota the following month.  It was redesignated as a very heavy bombardment squadron in anticipation of training and redeployment to the Pacific, but with the Japanese surrender, it was inactivated in October.

Air Force reserve
The squadron was reactivated in August 1947 at McChord Field, Washington as a reserve unit.  It trained under the supervision of Air Defense Command's 406th AAF Base Unit (later 2345th Air Force Reserve Training Center).  The squadron was nominally a heavy bomber unit, but it is not clear whether it had any combat aircraft assigned.  In 1948 Continental Air Command (ConAC) assumed responsibility for managing reserve and Air National Guard units from ADC. 

President Truman’s reduced 1949 defense budget required reductions in the number of units in the Air Force, At the same time, the May 1949 Air Force Reserve program called for a new type of unit, the Corollary unit, which was a reserve unit integrated with an active duty unit.  The plan was viewed as the best method to train reservists by mixing them with an existing regular unit to perform duties alongside the regular unit.   As a result, the 454th Group and its 736th Squadron moved to Spokane Air Force Base, Washington to become corollary units of the 92d Bombardment Wing, while the 738th was inactivated and its personnel were absorbed by units of the 302d Troop Carrier Wing at McChord.

The reserve mobilization for the Korean War had left the reserve without aircraft, and the reserves did not receive aircraft again until July 1952.   In preparing for the receipt of aircraft, in June 1952, ConAC activated the 454th Troop Carrier Wing at Portland International Airport, Oregon to replace the 922d Reserve Training Wing, the non-flying headquarters for reserve units there.  The squadron was redesignated the 738th Troop Carrier Squadron and activated with the 454th Wing.  It began training with Curtiss C-46 Commando transports.  However, on 1 January 1953, the 403d Troop Carrier Wing, a reserve unit that had served with Far East Air Forces in Japan and Korea, was relieved from active duty and replaced the 454th Wing at Portland.  As a result, the 738th inactivated and transferred it personnel and equipment to the 65th Troop Carrier Squadron, which was activated in its place.

Expeditionary airlift
The squadron was converted to provisional status and redesignated 738th Expeditionary Airlift Squadron.  It was originally assigned to Air Mobility Command to activate or inactivate as needed, but in 2003, it was transferred to Air Combat Command.  It was activated as a Lockheed C-130 Hercules airlift squadron as part of the Global War on Terrorism and it made up of multiple detachments from airlift squadrons which constantly rotate.

Lineage
 Constituted as the 738th Bombardment Squadron (Heavy) on 14 May 1943
 Activated on 1 June 1943
 Redesignated 738th Bombardment Squadron, Heavy c. 1944
 Redesignated 738th Bombardment Squadron, Very Heavy on 5 August 1945
 Inactivated on 17 October 1945
 Activated in the reserve on 16 August 1947
 Inactivated on 27 June 1949
 Redesignated 738th Troop Carrier Squadron, Medium on 26 May 1952
 Activated in the reserve on 13 June 1952
 Inactivated on 1 January 1953
 Redesignated: 738th Expeditionary Airlift Squadron and converted to provisional status on 12 June 2002

Assignments
 454th Bombardment Group, 1 June 1943 – 17 October 1945
 454th Bombardment Group, 16 August 1947 – 27 June 1949
 454th Troop Carrier Group, 13 June 1952 – 1 January 1953
 Air Mobility Command to activate or inactivate as needed, 12 June 2002
 Air Combat Command to activate or inactivate as needed, 19 March 2003

Stations
 Alamogordo Army Air Field, New Mexico, 1 June 1943
 Davis-Monthan Field, Arizona,  1 July 1943
 McCook Army Air Field, Nebraska, 30 July 1943
 Charleston Army Air Field, South Carolina, 3 October–8 December 1943
 San Giovanni Airfield, Italy 21 January 1944 – July 1945
 Sioux Falls Army Air Field, South Dakota, 1 August 1945
 Pyote Army Air Field, Texas, 17 August – 17 October 1945
 McChord Field (later McChord Air Force Base), Washington, 16 August 1947 – 27 June 1949
 Portland International Airport, Oregon, 13 June 1952 – 1 January 1953
 Undetermined location(s)

Aircraft
 Consolidated B-24 Liberator, 1943-1945
 Curtiss C-46 Commando, 1952-1953
 Lockheed C-130 Hercules After 2002

Awards and campaigns

References

Notes
 Explanatory notes

 Citations

Bibliography

 
 
 
 
 

Airlift squadrons of the United States Air Force
Air expeditionary squadrons of the United States Air Force